Panysinus is a genus of Asian jumping spiders that was first described by Eugène Louis Simon in 1901.

Species
 it contains five species, found only in Asia:
Panysinus grammicus Simon, 1902 – India
Panysinus nicholsoni (O. Pickard-Cambridge, 1900) – Indonesia (Java)
Panysinus nitens Simon, 1901 (type) – Malaysia, Indonesia (Sumatra)
Panysinus semiargenteus (Simon, 1877) – Philippines
Panysinus semiermis Simon, 1902 – Sri Lanka

References

Salticidae genera
Salticidae
Spiders of Asia